La Señal may refer to:

 La Señal (film), a 2007 film directed by Ricardo Darín and Martín Hodara
 La Señal (song), a 2012 song by Juanes